Mullanur-Bakhitovo (Mullanur Wäxitow) is a rural locality (a village) in Aitovsky Selsoviet, Bizhbulyaksky District, Bashkortostan, Russia. The population was 25 as of 2010. Alexeyevka is the nearest rural locality.

References

rural localities in Bizhbulyaksky District